Cadet Records was an American record label that began as Argo Records in 1955 as the jazz subsidiary of Chess Records. Argo changed its name in 1965 to Cadet to avoid confusion with the similarly named label in the UK. Cadet stopped releasing records around 1974, when its artists were moved to Chess.

There was also Cadet Concept Records, for rock and more adventurous music, such as the Rotary Connection, and the experimental psychedelic Electric Mud album by Muddy Waters. The label had a Top 20 hit in 1968 with the single "Pictures of Matchstick Men" by the British band Status Quo through a licensing arrangent with Pye Records in London. A St. Louis band known as The Truth a.k.a. The Acid Sette were signed and recorded for this label under the guidance of Abner Spector.

The masters are now owned by Universal Music.

Discography (1965-1975)

Continuation of the Argo 600 Jazz Series
Cadet was established in 1965 following a name change of the Argo label and continued their 600 Jazz series and the 4000 Blues series.

Continuation of the Argo 4000 Blues Series

Cadet Concept
Cadet Concept was established by Marshall Chess in 1967 with the first album by Rotary Connection and issued five albums by the group out of the 18 albums released on the label up until 1970 as well as featuring British band Status Quo, saxophonist John Klemmer and blues legends Muddy Waters and Howlin' Wolf.

GRT consolidated Chess/Cadet album discography (1971-1975)
In 1971 Chess Records was purchased by General Recorded Tape, a.k.a. GRT Corporation, which consolidated both the Chess and Cadet labels into a single labeling number sequence.

See also
 List of record labels

References

American record labels
Record labels established in 1955
Record labels disestablished in 1971
Jazz record labels
American companies established in 1955
Chess Records